Society of the Supporters for Progress, Society for the Progress of Iran or Society of the Seekers of Advancement of Iran or simply the Progressives, also known as the Liberals was a political party in constitutional period Persia and was active during the 2nd term of the Majlis, 1909–1911.

Progressives championed the development of the southern provinces of Persia and consisted of MPs representing the southerners. They promoted the building of hospitals, women's education and regarded Persian as "the official and scholarly" language of Iran.

Its organ Jonub was printed in Tehran and usually criticized the Bakhtiari, and held the view that the Iranian government did not understand the importance of the Persian Gulf region. The newspaper defended democracy and civil rights and explained that the "level of progress of any nation is symbolized in its degree of freedom of expression and press" and that the elections are the only means to exercise popular sovereignty and protect territorial  integrity as well as national interests.

The party was small and insignificant in numbers, but held the balance of power in the 2nd Majlis, allying with the Moderate Socialists Party and Union and Progress Party against the Democrat Party.

References 

Political parties established in 1909
1909 establishments in Iran
Political parties in Qajar Iran
Islamic political parties in Iran
Liberal parties in Iran
Anti-imperialist organizations
Nationalist parties in Asia
Progressive parties